Rochelia is a genus of flowering plants belonging to the family Boraginaceae. It is also in subtribe Eritrichiinae.

Its wide native range extends from Europe (within Albania, Austria, Baltic States, Belarus, Belgium, Bulgaria, Central European Russia, Corsica, Crimean Peninsula, Czechoslovakia, Denmark, East European Russia, the Faroe Islands, Finland, France, Germany, Great Britain, Greece, Hungary, Iceland, Ireland, Italy, Netherlands, North European Russia, Norway, Poland, Romania, South European Russis, Spain, Sweden, Switzerland, Ukraine and Yugoslavia) to Asia (in Altai, Kazakhstan, Kyrgyzstan, Mongolia, North Caucasus, Tajikistan,  Transcaucasus, Turkey, Turkmenistan, Tuva, Uzbekistan and Western Himalaya), Tibet and Xinjiang, (in China), north-western Africa (in Algeria, Morocco and Tunisia) and Western Asia (Afghanistan, Iran, Iraq, Lebanon, Syria, Oman, Pakistan and Palestine).

The genus name of Rochelia is in honour of Anton Rochel (1770–1847), an Austrian surgeon and naturalist, known for his botanical investigations of Banat and the Carpathians (Mountains). It was first described and published in Flora Vol.7 on page 243 in 1824.

The genus is recognized by the United States Department of Agriculture and the Agricultural Research Service and was last updated on 
31 July 2018, but they only list 2 species; Rochelia disperma  and Rochelia stylaris 

It was found by DNA analysis, that Rochelia is not monophyletic but paraphyletic (has more than one common ancestor).

Known species
According to Kew:

Rochelia bungei 
Rochelia campanulata 
Rochelia cancellata 
Rochelia cardiosepala 
Rochelia chitralensis 
Rochelia claviculata 
Rochelia disperma 
Rochelia drobovii 
Rochelia jackabaghii 
Rochelia laxa 
Rochelia leiocarpa 
Rochelia leiosperma 
Rochelia mirheydari 
Rochelia pamirica 
Rochelia peduncularis 
Rochelia persica 
Rochelia pygmaea 
Rochelia rectipes 
Rochelia retorta 
Rochelia retrosepala 
Rochelia sessiliflora 
Rochelia stylaris

References

Boraginoideae
Boraginaceae genera
Plants described in 1824